Soquel Demonstration State Forest (SDSF or SDF) is one of eight Cal Fire operated Demonstration State Forests totaling 71,000 acres. Collectively, the forests represent the most common forest types in the state. The State Forests grow approximately 75 million board feet yearly and harvest an average of 30 million board feet of timber each year, enough to build 3,000 single-family homes. Revenue from these harvests fund a variety of the Department's Resource Management Programs. In addition, the forests provide research and demonstration projects on forest management, while providing public recreation opportunities, fish and wildlife habitat, and watershed protection.

The Board of Forestry and Fire Protection (Board) policy provides that the State Forests shall be used for experimentation to determine the economic feasibility of artificial reforestation, and to demonstrate the productive and economic possibilities of good forest practices toward maintaining forest crop land in a productive condition. The management objectives and plans developed for each State Forest are subject to periodic review and approval by the Board.

Location and description

Soquel Demonstration Forest is situated in the Santa Cruz Mountains along California's central coast. Originally part of a Mexican "augmentation" land grant added to Rancho Soquel in 1844, the property was logged by several different owners prior to the State taking ownership in 1988. Today, the Forest allows the public to access the coastal redwoods and observe the wildlife that inhabit it.

Located along the east branch of Soquel Creek and including portions of Amaya Creek and Fern Gulch Creek, the forest contains redwood, mixed hardwoods, and riparian ecosystems. Soquel is geologically active, with the San Andreas and Zayante Faults passing through the property. Associated with the Forest's geologic activity are several natural springs and small marshes found in closed depressions, known as sag ponds.

Soquel is California's only State Forest located near large urban areas. Its proximity to the metropolitan centers of the San Francisco and Monterey Bay Area make it accessible to the public for use in forestry education and outdoor recreation.

Popularity for mountain biking
The forest, also known as "Demo," is home to a series of mountain biking trails.  Many of the singletrack trails course down ridges, largely on old logging road cuts created when the forest was first logged beginning in the 1930s. These routes were adopted as part of the recreational trail network when Cal Fire acquired the property in the early 1990s. Additional singletrack trails were established through Cal Fire's collaborations with local mountain biking clubs in 2000 (Braille Trail) and 2015 (Flow Trail). The trails have grown into some of the most popular in the California Bay Area and attract bikers from around the world. The trail network changes over time as Cal Fire conducts timber harvests in different areas of the forest. Old logging cuts (and the trails on them) are evaluated for long-term impacts to the watershed and steep sections are modified to limit erosion by either obliteration and recontouring, installing drainage structures, applying a top coat of hard crushed rock, or other measures. Singletrack trails are often realigned to help improve the recreational experience while protecting the watershed from excessive sediment delivery into the creek.

References

California state forests
1990 establishments in California
Santa Cruz Mountains